Lazar "Laza" Ristovski (born 26 October 1952) is a Serbian retired actor, director, producer and writer. He has appeared on stage about 4,000 times, and starred in over 40 films, TV series and TV dramas, mostly in lead roles. He briefly served as a member of the National Assembly from 1 August 2022 until his resignation on 9 August 2022.

Biography
He was born on 26 October 1952, in Ravno Selo village, part of Vrbas, SR Serbia, FPR Yugoslavia (modern Serbia), into a family of Yugoslav colonists, his father being born in Macedonia and was from Gugjakovo and his mother in Montenegro. He graduated from the Faculty of Dramatic Arts of the University of Belgrade as an actor.

In 1999 The White Suit an auteur film by Ristovski (director, writer, lead actor, and producer) was at the Cannes Film Festival in the Critics Week program. The White Suit was the Serbian entry for the 1999 Academy Awards.

Lazar Ristovski is the sole owner of Zillion Film Company

In 2006, he made a small appearance in the James Bond film Casino Royale. He played Caruso in the 2004 movie King of Thieves. He starred as Đorđe in the award-winning 2009 film St. George Shoots the Dragon.

Ristovski has achieved his "Hollywood dream" by acting in the indie movie Along the Roadside.  He most recently played Russian President-elect and former Army General Arkady Fedorov in Pierce Brosnan's movie The November Man which came out in 2014.

In 2016 he starred in and produced the film Train Driver's Diary which was the Serbian entry for the Best Foreign Language Film at the 89th Academy Awards. The film won three awards at the 2017 Prague Independent Film Festival – the Grand Prix, Best Actor (Lazar Ristovski), and Best Feature Film.

Ristovski is the organizer of the Ravno Selo Film Festival which was held for the first time in June 2017.

He is also the author of four books; Belo odelo (The White Suit), Kako sam dobio Oskara (How I Got an Oscar), Jednostavne priče (Simple Stories) and Ulična akademija (Street Academy).

Political career 
Ristovski appeared in the fourth position on the Serbian Progressive Party's Together We Can Do Everything electoral list in the 2022 general election as an independent candidate. This was tantamount to election, and he was indeed elected when the list won a plurality victory with 120 out of 250 seats. He said before the assembly convened that he planned to resign his mandate, which indeed he did on 9 August 2022. It has been speculated that he may be appointed as minister of culture in the Serbian government.

Selected filmography

 Hajka (1977) – Ivan
 Kvar (1978) – psihijatar Savić
 Svetozar Marković (1980) – Svetozar Marković
 Igmanski marš (1983) – Josip Broz Tito
 Zadarski memento (1984) – Krševan Stipčević
 Jazol (1985) – Nikola
 The Way Steel Was Tempered (1988) – Leo
 The Bizarre Country (1988) – Putnik
 Granica (1990) – Topić
 Hajde da se volimo 3 (1990) – Miloje
 The Original of the Forgery (1991) – Pavle
 Tito and Me (1992) – Raja
 Vizantijsko plavo (1993) – Aranđel
 Underground (1995) – Crni (Blacky) / Actor playing Blacky
 Rage (1997) – Kovač
 Balkanska pravila (1997) – Matori
 Cabaret Balkan (1998) – The Boxer Who Takes the Train
 The Second Wife (1998) – Fosco
 Goodbye, 20th Century! (1998) – Santa Claus
 Belo odelo (1999) – Savo / Vuko Tiodorović
 Boomerang (2001) – Bobi
 Mali svet (2003) – Stariji vodnik Ras
 King of Thieves (2004) – Caruso
 Falling in the Paradise (2004) – Ljubiša Kundačina
 Midwinter Night's Dream (2004) – Lazar
 Dobro uštimani mrtvaci (2005) – Ruždija Kučuk
 Krojačeva tajna (2006) – Pukovnik
 Tomorrow Morning (2006) – Zdravko
 Optimisti (2006) – Profesor Gavrilo / Simon / Pokojni Ratomir / Gazda Pera / Aleksa Pantić
 Casino Royale (2006) – Kaminofsky
 S. O. S. – Spasite nase duše (2007) – Gvozden
 Sonetàula (2008) – Egidio Malune
 St. George Shoots the Dragon (2009) – Đorđe žandar
 Đavolja varoš (2009) – Rajko Zorić
 Honeymoons (2009) – Verin stric
 Beli lavovi (2011) – Dile
 The Priest's Children (2013) – Biskup
 Along the Roadside (2013) – Milutin
 The November Man (2014) – Arkady Federov
 We Will Be the World Champions (2015) – Josip Broz Tito
 Za kralja i otadžbinu (2015)
 On the Other Side (2016) – Žarko
 Train Driver's Diary (2016) – Ilija
 King Peter of Serbia (2018) – King Peter I 
 Neverending Past (2018)
 L'uomo che comprò la luna (2018)

References

External links
 Official Site

1952 births
Living people
People from Vrbas, Serbia
Serbian male actors
Serbian film directors
Serbian film producers
Serbian film score composers
Serbian novelists
University of Belgrade Faculty of Dramatic Arts alumni
Serbian people of Macedonian descent
Serbian people of Montenegrin descent
Golden Arena winners
Zoran Radmilović Award winners
Croatian Theatre Award winners
Members of the National Assembly (Serbia)